Les Costes (Vivaro-Alpine: Las Còstas) is a former commune in the Hautes-Alpes department in southeastern France. On 1 January 2018, it was merged into the new commune of Aubessagne.

Population

See also
Communes of the Hautes-Alpes department

References

Former communes of Hautes-Alpes